Paradise Hotel is a reality television series.

Paradise Hotel may also refer to:
Paradise Hotel (Hyderabad), India
Paradise Hotel, the site of the 2002 Mombasa attacks in Nairobi, Kenya
Paradise Hotel (2010 film), a 2010 Bulgarian documentary film
Paradise Hotel (2019 film), a 2019 Peruvian comedy film
L'Hôtel du libre échange, an 1894 French comedy by playwright Georges Feydeau, sometimes translated as Paradise Hotel

See also
 Hotel Paradise (disambiguation)